Fatima Ben Saïdane (born 25 December 1949), is a Tunisian actress. One of the earliest pillars of Tunisian cinema, she is best known for her roles in the blockbuster critically acclaimed films Making Of, Halfaouine: Boy of the Terraces and Thala My Love.

Personal life
She was born on 25 December 1949 in Tunis, Tunisia.

Career
Fatima started her film career in 1989 with the film Arab and played a minor role 'Asfour'. In the same year, she acted in the film Layla, Ma Raison. In 1990, she played the role 'Salouha' in the film Halfaouine: Boy of the Terraces. After many minor supportive roles in late 1990s, she made lead appearance in six short and feature films in 2006: 10 Courts, 10 Regards, Dementia, Me, My Sister and the Thing, Mrs Bahja, Making Of and The TV Is Coming.

Partial filmography

References

External links
 
 Images
 Filmography of Fatima Ben Saïdane

Living people
Tunisian film actresses
1949 births
Tunisian television actresses
People from Tunis